Ganwaria is a medium size village in Balrampur district, Uttar Pradesh state of India. It is a noted archaeological site, along with Piprahwa.

References 

Villages in Balrampur district, Uttar Pradesh